Kenneth Alexander may refer to:

 Kenneth Alexander (economist) (1922–2001), Scottish economist and university administrator
 Kenny Alexander (Kenneth Cooper Alexander, born 1966), American politician in Virginia
 Kenny Alexander (businessman) (Kenneth Jack Alexander, born 1969), British businessman
 Kenneth Alexander (photographer) (1887–1975), photographer for film companies

See also
 Ken Alexander (born 1953), former NASCAR driver